Individual dressage equestrian at the 2013 Southeast Asian Games in Wunna Theikdi Equestrian Field, Naypyidaw, Myanmar from December 13 to 14, 2013.

Schedule
All times are Myanmar Standard Time (UTC+06:30)

Results 
Legend
RT — Retired
WD — Withdrawn
EL — Eliminated
NS — Not Started

References 

Equestrian at the 2013 Southeast Asian Games